Wolfgang Herz (born 1950) is a German billionaire businessman, co-owner of the German coffee shop and retail chain Tchibo.

Family business
Herz is the son of Max Herz and Ingeburg Herz. His father co-founded Tchibo in 1949 with Carl Tchilinghiryan.

In 2003, along with his mother and brother, he  bought out his other brother, Günter Herz, and sister, Daniela Herz-Schnoekel.

Personal life
According to Forbes, Herz has a net worth of US$4.5 billion, as of September 2022.
Herz lives in Hamburg.

References 

Living people
1950 births
German billionaires
20th-century German businesspeople
21st-century German businesspeople
German businesspeople in retailing
Wolfgang